You Belong to Me is a 1934 American drama film directed by Alfred L. Werker and written by Elizabeth Alexander, Walter DeLeon, Grover Jones and William Slavens McNutt. The film stars Lee Tracy, Helen Mack, Helen Morgan, David Holt, Arthur Pierson, Lynne Overman and Dean Jagger. The film was released on September 14, 1934, by Paramount Pictures.

Plot

Cast 
Lee Tracy as Bud Hannigan
Helen Mack as Florette Faxon
Helen Morgan as Bonnie Kay
David Holt as Jimmy Faxon
Arthur Pierson as Hap Stanley
Lynne Overman as Brown 
Dean Jagger as Military School Instructor
Edwin Stanley as Major Hurley 
Irene Ware as Lila Lacey
Lou Cass as Joe Mandel
Max Mack as Jack Mandel
Mary Owen as Maizie Kelly
Neal Dodd as Minister at Funeral 
Irving Bacon as Stage Manager

References

External links 
 

1934 films
1930s English-language films
American drama films
1934 drama films
Paramount Pictures films
Films directed by Alfred L. Werker
American black-and-white films
1930s American films